76th may refer to:

76th Academy Awards ceremony honored films of 2003
76th Air Army, an air army of the Soviet Air Forces from 1949 to 1980 and from 1988 to 1998
76th Air Assault Division (Russia), a division of the Russian Airborne Troops based in Pskov
76th Air Division (76th AD) is an inactive United States Air Force organization
76th Air Refueling Squadron (76 ARS) is part of the 514th Air Mobility Wing at McGuire Air Force Base, New Jersey
76th Airlift Division, a division of the United States Air Force, activated on 1 March 1976
76th Airlift Squadron (76 AS), part of the 86th Airlift Wing at Ramstein Air Base, Germany
76th Army Band (United States), a direct support band based in Mannheim, Germany
76th Delaware General Assembly, a meeting of the legislative branch of the state government
76th Division (People's Republic of China), a military formation of the People's Volunteer Army during the Korean War
76th Division (United States), a unit of the United States Army in World War I and World War II
76th Field Artillery Regiment (United States), a Field Artillery regiment of the United States Army
76th Fighter Squadron (76 FS), a United States Air Force Reserve unit
76th Grey Cup, the 1988 Canadian Football League championship game played at Lansdowne Park in Ottawa
76th Illinois Volunteer Infantry Regiment, an infantry regiment that served in the Union Army during the American Civil War
76th Infantry Brigade Combat Team (United States) ("Night Hawks") is a modular infantry brigade of the United States Army National Guard of Indiana
76th Infantry Division (Germany), created on 26 August 1939 together with the 23rd Infantry Division in Potsdam
76th Infantry Division (United Kingdom), a Second World War British Army unit created for service during that war
76th Maintenance Wing (76 MXW), a wing of the United States Air Force based out of Tinker Air Force Base, Oklahoma City Oklahoma
76th meridian east, a line of longitude
76th meridian west, a line of longitude
76th Ohio Infantry, an infantry regiment of the Union Army during the American Civil War
76th Oregon Legislative Assembly, convened beginning on January 11, 2011, for its regular session
76th parallel north, a circle of latitude
76th parallel south, a circle of latitude
76th Punjabis, an infantry regiment of the British Indian Army
76th Reconnaissance Group, a World War II United States Army Air Forces organization
76th Reserve Division (German Empire), a unit of the Imperial German Army in World War I
76th Rifle Division (Soviet Union), a Soviet infantry fighting unit of the Red Army that fought on the Eastern Front during the Second World War
76th Space Control Squadron (76 SPCS), an offensive counter space unit located at Peterson AFB, Colorado
76th Street (IRT Third Avenue Line), a local station on the demolished IRT Third Avenue Line in New York City
76th United States Congress, a meeting of the legislative branch of the United States federal government

See also
California's 76th State Assembly district, one of 80 districts in the California State Assembly
CMLL 76th Anniversary Show, a professional wrestling major show event in 2009 in Arena Mexico, Mexico City, Mexico
76 (number)
AD 76, the year 76 (LXXVI) of the Julian calendar